is a Japanese professional wrestler currently working for the Japanese promotion All Japan Pro Wrestling where he is a former All Asia Tag Team Champions alongside Hikaru Sato.

Professional wrestling career

Japanese independent scene (2019-present)

Tamura seldomly competes for several promotions from the Japanese independent scene. At 2AW Infinity ~ 2020 Winter, an event promoted by Active Advance Pro Wrestling on December 20, 2020, he fell short to Tank Nagai. At Pro Wrestling Zero1's Chikara Matsuri Special event from March 27, 2021, Tamura teamed up with Suwama and defeated Ryuki Honda and Shuji Ishikawa.<ref>{{cite web|url=https://www.z-1.co.jp/event/detail_20210327.html|script-title=ja:奉納プロレス 第19回大和神州 ちから祭りスペシャル～プロレスオールスター大チャリティー祭り～|work=z-1.co.jp|author=Pro Wrestling Zero1|language=Japanese|date=March 27, 2021|access-date=October 6, 2022}}</ref> At Korakuen Hall 60th Anniversary Festival, a cross-over event held by AJPW in partnership with New Japan Pro Wrestling on April 16, 2022, Tamura teamed up with Runaway Suplex (Shotaro Ashino and Suwama) in a losing effort against Chaos (Hirooki Goto, Yoh and Yoshi-Hashi). At Gleat G PROWRESTLING Ver. 3 on September 25, 2022, Tamura teamed up with Hayato Tamura and Rising Hayato in a losing effort against Abdullah Kobayashi, Kaz Hayashi and Yuji Okabayashi.

All Japan Pro Wrestling (2019-present)
Tamura is best known for competing in All Japan Pro Wrestling, promotion in which he has also made his professional wrestling debut on January 2, 2019, on the first night of the AJPW New Year's Wars where he first competed in a 15-man battle royal won by Jake Lee and also involving notable opponents such as Gianni Valletta, Atsushi Aoki, Masanobu Fuchi, Kotaro Suzuki and Osamu Nishimura, and secondly in a tag team match in which he paired up with Dan Tamura in a losing effort against Hikaru Sato and Atsushi Aoki. At AJPW 50th Anniversary on September 18, 2022, Tamura and Hikrau Sato defeated Voodoo Murders (Minoru and Toshizo) to win the All Asia Tag Team Championship. At AJPW Summer Action Series 2022 on July 14, Tamura unsuccessfully challenged Tiger Mask for the World Junior Heavyweight Championship. On the first night of the AJPW Raising An Army Memorial Series 2022'' from October 2, Tamura unsuccessfully challenged Toshizo for the Gaora TV Championship.

Tamura is known for competing in various of the promotion's signature events such as the AJPW Junior Tag League, making his first appearance at the 2020 edition where he teamed up with Hikaru Sato as a sub-unit of the Evolution stable, defeating Yu Iizuka and Tetsuya Izuchi in the first rounds, Enfants Terribles (Hokuto Omori and Yusuke Kodama) in the semifinals, and Atsuki Aoyagi and Raising Hayato in the finals from December 26. At the 2021 edition, he teamed up with Hikaru Sato again and won the entire competition after defeating Black Menso~Re and Hiroshi Yamato in the first rounds, Atsuki Aoyagi and Yu Iizuka in the semifinals, but falling short to Total Eclipse (Hokuto Omori and Yusuke Kodama) in the finals, with all matches occurring on December 27. Another competition for which he is known to evolve in is the AJPW Junior League, making his first appearance at the 2021 edition where he fell short to Tatsuhito Takaiwa in the first rounds from June 2. As for the Ōdō Tournament, Tamura made his first appearance at the 2022 edition where he fell short to Shotaro Ashino in the first rounds from August 7.

Championships and accomplishments
All Japan Pro Wrestling
All Asia Tag Team Championship (1 time) – with Hikaru Sato
AJPW Junior Tag League (2020) – with Hikaru Sato
Asunaro Cup (2020)

References

1999 births
Living people
Japanese male professional wrestlers
People from Ibaraki Prefecture
Sportspeople from Ibaraki Prefecture
21st-century professional wrestlers